Manatawny is an unincorporated community in Berks County, Pennsylvania, United States. It is located at the junction on PA Route 73 and Hoch Road in Oley Township, a short distance from Pleasantville.

History
A post office called Manatawny was established in 1851, and remained in operation until 1968. The community took its name from nearby Manatawny Creek.

History

Unincorporated communities in Berks County, Pennsylvania
Unincorporated communities in Pennsylvania